The 2012 Tirreno–Adriatico was the 47th running of the Tirreno–Adriatico cycling stage race, often known as the Race of two seas. It started on 7 March in Donoratico and ended on 13 March in San Benedetto del Tronto and consisted of seven stages, including a team time trial to begin the race and an individual time trial to conclude it. It was the third race of the 2012 UCI World Tour season.

Nibali also took home the red jersey for amassing the highest number of points during stages at intermediate sprints and stage finishes, and won the general classification by fourteen seconds over runner-up Horner. Kreuziger completed the podium, 12 seconds behind Horner and 26 seconds down on Nibali.

In the race's other classifications, Wout Poels of  won the white jersey for the highest placed rider born in 1987 or later by placing eighth overall in the general classification, while  rider Stefano Pirazzi won the King of the Mountains classification, and  finished at the head of the teams classification.

Teams
As Tirreno–Adriatico was a UCI World Tour event, all 18 UCI ProTeams were invited automatically and obligated to send a squad. Four other squads were given wildcard places into the race, and as such, formed the event's 22-team peloton.

The 22 teams that competed in the race were:

Stages

Stage 1
7 March 2012 — San Vincenzo to Donoratico, team time trial (TTT)

Following the introduction of a race-opening team time trial by organisers in 2011, the 2012 event began in the same fashion with a short test between the towns of San Vincenzo and Donoratico; both of which are synonymous within Italian cycling as the start and finish towns of the early-season Gran Premio della Costa Etruschi race.  were the first team to set off from the start, and set the early benchmark with a time of 19' 19", but only held the top spot for a short period. The third team on the course,  – winners of the 2011 Tour de France team time trial, and a time trial in February's Tour of Qatar – were touted as favourites for the stage by several team personnel, and lived up to that, as the team went under the nineteen-minute barrier, with a time of 18' 58".

However, the eventual stage-winning time came from the  team, newly formed for the 2012 season. As Matthew Goss was the first of the team's riders to cross the line, he was entitled to wear the race's first azzurra jersey, while Cameron Meyer was also part of the train at the finish and thus was the best placed rider under the age of 25. Sporting director Matt White later expressed his delight at the team's run, and was surprised at the team's large margin of victory.

Outside of the top five placed teams, as Roman Kreuziger's  team rounded out the top five, several of the teams with general classification favourites suffered arduous runs in the stage.

Stage 2
8 March 2012 — San Vincenzo to Indicatore, 

Diego Caccia of  instigated the breakaway of the day, and was joined shortly after by a rider from the  team, with Stefano Pirazzi joining Caccia out front. Caccia and Pirazzi quickly stepped up the pace to pull clear of the peloton, fronted by the  team of race leader Matthew Goss. Pirazzi again crossed the line first ahead of Caccia, and thus guaranteed himself the first green jersey of the race for mountains classification leader. Their advantage stayed largely between four-and-a-half and five minutes before entering the finishing circuit,  in length, at Indicatore for the first of two laps.

 and  joined  at the head of the main field and set about cutting into the lead duo's advantage, and by the time the first lap was complete, the gap was under a minute; within the next , the breakaway was over after around  clear. Farrar held the lead until the closing metres as Mark Cavendish accelerated past him, following a lead-out from Edvald Boasson Hagen, to record his fourth victory of the season ahead of a closing Óscar Freire and Farrar. Cavendish moved into fifth place overall, and assumed the lead of the points classification.

Stage 3
9 March 2012 — Indicatore to Terni, 

 rider Filippo Savini broke away from the field almost from the start of the stage, and managed to get clear without a breakaway companion. The main field decided not to follow him closely to begin with, as he was not a factor in the overall classification; over nine minutes behind overnight leader Matthew Goss of the  team. Savini's lead grew to over eleven minutes at one point during the stage, but due to windy conditions and the peloton stepping up the pace, it was quickly reduced to around 7' 30" with just over  remaining on the stage. Savini gained maximum points on the road; crossing the line first at the two intermediate sprints – gaining six bonus seconds in the process – and also crested the climb at Todi first, with team-mate Stefano Pirazzi maintaining his lead in that competition by crossing second.

Many of the sprinters' teams launched themselves frontwards in order to set themselves up for the finish in Terni, coming on cobblestones in the town centre. With no further attacks getting away, it eventually came down to a sprint finish;  looked to get Tyler Farrar the stage victory, but were caught out by an early sprint from 's Edvald Boasson Hagen, who had been expected to lead-out for team-mate Mark Cavendish, but with Cavendish not in his best shape – despite picking up two bonus seconds at an intermediate sprint – it was left to Boasson Hagen to contest for the honours; taking his team's tenth victory of the season.

Stage 4
10 March 2012 — Amelia to Chieti, 

On the stage itself, seven riders from six different teams, including mountains classification leader Stefano Pirazzi formed a part of the breakaway. The main field decided not to follow them closely to begin with, with the lead increasing dramatically in the early stages, reaching an ultimate maximum gap of around twelve minutes. With Pirazzi in the lead group, it enabled the  rider to extend his already substantial lead in the mountains classification, taking maximum points on the first two climbs of the stage.

With the peloton closing, Pavel Brutt and Manuele Boaro of  both launched solo attacks in order to maintain their move ahead of the advancing pack. Another crash split the field once again, and  continued to hold front at the head of the peloton as it moved towards the finish. Kreuziger and Nibali both launched bids for victory, but it was Sagan that prevailed, ultimately. Horner's gain for making this small group was to assume the race lead, from 's Matthew Goss.

Stage 5
11 March 2012 — Martinsicuro to Prati di Tivo, 

Three riders – 's Jens Debusschere,  rider Egoi Martínez and Kristof Goddaert of  – advanced clear of the main field after  of the stage, and managed to extend their advantage to a maximum of around ten-and-a-half minutes at one point during the early running of the stage. Goddaert was dropped on the Piano Roseto, as his two rivals looked to step up their pace in advance of the -led peloton, who had been cutting into their lead quite effectively; reducing their gap out front from around 10' 30" at the start of the climb to a much smaller margin of 3' 30" by its conclusion.

The race was together once again not long after, as the two remaining escapees were brought back slowly into the main pack, which had numbers reducing by the kilometre. By the time that the field has reached the climb up to Prati di Tivo, around 25 riders remained in contention for the stage honours. Horner himself had elevated the pace in the lead group, and continued to shell riders from it. His gap quickly went to nearly 30 seconds, which would have put Horner in trouble to keep the jersey, but he increased the pace once again; Nibali's eventual winning margin was 16 seconds over Kreuziger, who cut another two seconds off Horner's lead overall, reducing the margin to just five seconds. Nibali also moved within twelve seconds of Horner.

Stage 6
12 March 2012 — Offida to Offida, 

The final mass-start stage of the race revolved around a circuit race in and around Offida. Cavendish later abandoned the race, in order to recover for the Milan – San Remo Monument classic on 17 March.

Danilo Di Luca and Michele Scarponi launched punchy attacks not long after, as did Christophe Riblon and Domenico Pozzovivo, but  shut down all the moves via their points classification leader Peter Sagan, who had remained with the lead group. Sagan's closing of the group set up a final attack from 's Joaquim Rodríguez with  remaining, and held on to win his third career Tirreno–Adriatico stage. Vincenzo Nibali led Di Luca over the line for second, assuming the points classification lead from Sagan, and moved to within six seconds of 's Chris Horner – who finished fourth on the stage – ahead of the final time trial stage.

Stage 7 
13 March 2012 — San Benedetto del Tronto, individual time trial (ITT)

The Tirreno–Adriatico ended as its parent race, the Giro d'Italia, had for the last four years, with an individual time trial. San Benedetto del Tronto in the Marche region played host to a perfectly flat out-and-back ride right along the Adriatic coast; it was held on the same course as the 2011 edition, where Fabian Cancellara claimed victory for the  team, in a time of 10' 33". Cancellara was the pre-stage favourite, but much of the focus was upon the impending three-rider battle for the overall honours between 's Chris Horner, 's Roman Kreuziger and 's Vincenzo Nibali; the three riders were split by just six seconds prior to the stage. As was customary of time trial stages, cyclists set off in reverse order from where they were ranked in the general classification at the end of the previous stage.

Rasmussen set a time of 11' 05" for the course, but was immediately beaten by 's Svein Tuft – the Canadian national champion – who went inside the 11-minute barrier, with a time of 10' 52". Tuft's time was briefly troubled by Manuele Boaro, a former Italian junior national champion, with the  rider coming within a second of beating Tuft's time. His time of 10' 36", three seconds outside of his 2011 time, was ultimately good enough to give him his second win of the season, and his fourth career Tirreno–Adriatico stage victory.

Two hours later, the focus shifted to the overall battle; Nibali was the first to leave with Kreuziger and Horner later setting off in two-minute intervals from one another. Nibali set a time of 5' 21" to the intermediate point, and took the virtual lead of the race on the road as Horner and Kreuziger could only muster 5' 32" and 5' 34" respectively. Nibali managed to hold a good pace right to the end of the stage, recording a time of 10' 56"; good enough for ninth place on the stage. Kreuziger struggled in the closing stages, and lost a total of 27 seconds to Nibali, while Horner also lost time to Nibali in the second half of the course; finishing in a time of 11' 16", and thus Nibali became the third Italian in four years to win the race. Nibali added the overall victory to his success in the points classification, while 's Wout Poels managed to just hold off  rider Cameron Meyer in the young rider classification by eight seconds.

Classification leadership table
In the Tirreno–Adriatico, four different jerseys were awarded. For the general classification, calculated by adding each cyclist's finishing times on each stage, and allowing time bonuses in intermediate sprints and at the finish in mass-start stages, the leader received a blue jersey. This classification was considered the most important of the 2012 Tirreno–Adriatico, and the winner was considered the winner of the race itself.

Additionally, there was a points classification, which awarded a red jersey. In the points classification, cyclists got points for finishing in the top ten in a stage. The stage win awarded 12 points, second place awarded 10 points, third 8, and one point fewer per place down the line, to a single point for tenth. In addition, the first four riders across the intermediate sprint lines earned points, 5, 3, 2, and 1 in succession.

There was also a mountains classification, which awarded a green jersey. In the mountains classification, points were won by reaching the top of a mountain before other cyclists. There were sixteen recognised climbs in the race, and unlike most other races, the climbs were not separated into categories – each awarded the same points to the first four riders over its summit, on a scale of 5, 3, 2, and 1 in succession.

The fourth jersey represented the young rider classification, marked by a white jersey. This was decided the same way as the general classification, but only riders born after 1 January 1987 were eligible to be ranked in the classification.

There was also a classification for teams, in which the times of the best three cyclists per team on each stage were added together; the leading team at the end of the race was the team with the lowest total time.

References

External links
 

Tirreno–Adriatico
Tirreno-Adriatico
Tirreno-Adriatico